Melliodora may refer to:

 Eucalyptus melliodora, a tree known as Yellow Box 
 Melliodora, Hepburn Permaculture Gardens, a demonstration property of David Holmgren at Hepburn Springs, Victoria, Australia